The  Worshipful Company of Tobacco Pipe Makers and Tobacco Blenders is one of the Livery Companies of the City of London. The Company ranks 82nd in the order of precedence of the Companies. It does not have its own livery hall but meets instead at various halls of other Livery Companies.

The company's motto is Producat Terra, Latin for Out of the Earth. Its church is St. Lawrence Jewry next Guildhall, the official Church of the Corporation of London, located on Gresham Street.

History
The company was first incorporated in 1619 by Royal Charter granted by King James I, with responsibility for regulating the manufacture of clay tobacco pipes in the City of London. In 1643, following the outbreak of the English Civil War in 1642, the Company forfeited its Charter through non-payment of its annual rent to King Charles I. The company was restored by King Charles II in 1663 but was declared bankrupt in 1868 after its powers of regulation over tobacco pipe makers were abolished and its income from its members had declined significantly. The company was reincorporated as the Worshipful Company of Tobacco Pipe Makers and Tobacco Blenders in 1954 by members of the Briar Pipe and Tobacco Trades, and in 1960 became a Livery Company once more.  As a result of this chequered history, and despite its earlier incorporation, it now ranks as a Modern Company, standing at number 82 in the Order of Precedence of Livery Companies in the City of London.

The Company elected its first female Master, Fiona J Adler, in 2011.  Fiona became a Liveryman in 1997 and was the first woman to become a Freeman, a Trustee of the Benevolent Fund and subsequently Master of the company. On her installation as Master, she was following in the footsteps of her father and her grandfather.  Her grandfather was the first Master of the Third Company in 1954 and was again elected Master in 1965.  Her father was Master of the Company in 1982.  Fiona was elected Non-Aldermanic Sheriff of the City of London for 2014–15.

Modern activities and Officers
In common with most of the other City Livery Companies, the company is no longer a trade association and is concerned only with philanthropy, benevolence and fellowship. Its freemen and liverymen enjoy a range of social events and activities.  They donate and raise funds that are invested to enable dividends to be distributed to a range of charities and educational institutions through the company's Benevolent Fund, as well as to members of the tobacco trade and their families who may need support.

The Master of the company for 2022-23 is Paul Taberer.  Sandra Stocker is the Clerk.

References

External links
 City of London Livery Companies
 The Worshipful Company of Tobacco Pipe Makers and Tobacco Blenders

Tobacco Pipe Makers and Tobacco Blenders
1619 establishments in England